3-Bromofuran is a colorless, organic compound with the molecular formula C4H3BrO. A versatile intermediate product for synthesizing more complex compounds, it used in the syntheses of a variety of economically important drugs.

A liquid at room temperature, it has a similar boiling point to water (102.5-102.6 °C), but with a significantly higher density (1.6606 g/cm3 at 20 °C). While colorless when pure, it can appear light yellow when minor impurities are present. It is usually stabilized by calcium carbonate.

Synthesis 
3-Bromofuran was obtained in minor amounts in 1887 as a by-product in a reaction of 3-bromofuroic acid with calcium hydroxide. Four decades later, it was prepared deliberately and in higher yield. 3-bromofuran has since also been prepared from 3,4-dibromofuran via ortho-metalation with butyllithium in good yield. A synthesis of 3-bromofuran is due to Fechtel who prepared this compound via a Diels Alder-bromination-reverse Diels Alder sequence.

Applications 
3-Bromofuran is a useful starting material for 3-substituted furans, a structural motif widespread in chemotherapy agents, HIV drugs, type 2 diabetes treatments, drugs for osteoporosis and experimental drugs for Alzheimer's disease. For example, the total synthesis of (+)Cacospongionolide B, a sesterterpene with anti-inflammatory properties, has been accomplished using 3-bromofuran as a starting compound. It was also used to synthesize Rosefuran, a constituent chemical of the odor of the rose and an insect sex attractant. 3-bromofuran was reacted with 3,3-dimethylallyl bromide and lithium diisopropylamide, followed by reaction at with iodomethane and N-butyllithium.

The total synthesis of (−)-neothiobinupharidine, a bioactive alkaloid isolated from Nuphar pumila (the small yellow pond-lily) was accomplished in eight steps employing two moles of 3-bromofuran. Similarly, one of the steps of the total synthesis of Salvinorin A, the primary hallucinogenic compound in Salvia divinorum, a Mexican plant used by Mazatec shamans, used 3-bromofuran as a reactant.

References 

3-Furyl compounds
Bromoarenes